Eslamabad-e Pain (also Romanized as Eslāmābād-e Pā’īn; also known as Eslāmābād-e Paeen) is a village in Mazraeh-ye Shomali Rural District, Voshmgir District, Aqqala County, Golestan Province, Iran. At the 2006 census, its population was 327, in 60 families.

References 

Populated places in Aqqala County